Anras is a municipality in the district of Lienz in the Austrian state of Tyrol.

Geography
The settlement is situated in the East Tyrolean part of the Puster Valley, stretching along the upper Drava river between the Villgraten Mountains (Defereggen) in the north to the foothills of the Lienz Dolomites, the westernmost peaks of the Gailtal Alps. The farmsteads lie mostly on the sunny terraces or on the valley floor north of the Drava.

The municipal area comprises the cadastral communities of Anras proper, Asch-Winkl, and Ried.

History
From about 1200, Anras Castle was built as a summer residence of the Bishops of Brixen. In 1236, Emperor Frederick II granted them the surrounding Puster Valley estates up to the Lienz suburbs where they bordered the lands of the rivaling Counts of Gorizia.

In 1754, the castle was rebuilt in a Baroque style  and served as the seat of the local administration. The territories were held by the Brixen prince-bishops until the secularisation of 1803. Today, the fertile soils of Anras are known as the East Tyrolean breadbasket.

References

External links

Cities and towns in Lienz District